Kongota is a genus of cicadas from Southeast Africa.

References

Hemiptera of Africa
Taxa named by William Lucas Distant
Cicadidae genera
Platypleurini